Jouri is an Arabic feminine given name said to mean damask rose. It is written in Arabic as جوري. It has been translated into English with multiple other spellings, including Jawri, Jooree, Joory, Jori, Jorie, Jory, Jouree, Jourie, Joury, Juri or Jury.   It has also been transcribed into other languages with other spellings.

It is a popular name for girls in Arabic-speaking countries, including Israel, where it was among the ten most popular names given to girls born to Muslim parents in 2020. It was also the most popular name for girls born in Jordan in 2020. 

It is also in use in the United States in various spellings. In 2020, 15 girls born in the U.S. were named Jouri, 15 Joury, and 12 Juri. 

Thirty-eight girls born in the U.S. in 2020 were named Jori, a name that has multiple spellings and origins including from the Arabic source. Other spellings were also in use in the U.S., where 28 girls born in 2020 were named Jorie and 20 were named Jory.

In 2021, 24 American girls were registered with the name Joury, 24 with the name Juri and 17 with the name Jouri. Another 39 newborn American girls were named Jori, 27 Jorie, and 18 Jory.

References

Arabic feminine given names
Given names derived from plants or flowers